Raphael Florêncio Margarido (born 28 April 1983) is a Brazilian former professional volleyball player.

Honours

Clubs
 FIVB Club World Championship
  Doha 2011 – with Jastrzębski Węgiel
  Betim 2013 – with Sada Cruzeiro

 CSV South American Club Championship
  Belo Horizonte 2014 – with Sada Cruzeiro

 CEV Challenge Cup
  2014/2015 – with SL Benfica

 National championships
 2004/2005  Brazilian Championship, with Esporte Clube Banespa
 2012/2013  Portuguese SuperCup, with SL Benfica 
 2012/2013  Portuguese Championship, with SL Benfica
 2013/2014  Brazilian Cup, with Sada Cruzeiro
 2013/2014  Brazilian Championship, with Sada Cruzeiro
 2014/2015  Portuguese SuperCup, with SL Benfica 
 2014/2015  Portuguese Cup, with SL Benfica
 2014/2015  Portuguese Championship, with SL Benfica 
 2016/2017  Portuguese SuperCup, with SL Benfica 
 2016/2017  Portuguese Championship, with SL Benfica
 2017/2018  Portuguese Cup, with SL Benfica

Youth national team
 2002  CSV U21 South American Championship

Individual awards
 2011: Pan American Cup – Best Setter

References

External links
 
 Player profile at PlusLiga.pl 
 Player profile at Volleybox.net

1983 births
Living people
Sportspeople from São Paulo (state)
Brazilian men's volleyball players
Brazilian expatriate sportspeople in Turkey
Expatriate volleyball players in Turkey
Brazilian expatriate sportspeople in Romania
Expatriate volleyball players in Romania
Brazilian expatriate sportspeople in Poland
Expatriate volleyball players in Poland
Brazilian expatriate sportspeople in Portugal
Halkbank volleyball players
Jastrzębski Węgiel players
BKS Visła Bydgoszcz players
Setters (volleyball)